Eris (minor-planet designation 136199 Eris) is the most massive and second-largest known dwarf planet in the Solar System. It is a trans-Neptunian object (TNO) in the scattered disk and has a high-eccentricity orbit. Eris was discovered in January 2005 by a Palomar Observatory–based team led by Mike Brown and verified later that year. In September 2006, it was named after the GrecoRoman goddess of strife and discord. Eris is the ninth-most massive known object orbiting the Sun and the sixteenth-most massive overall in the Solar System (counting moons). It is also the largest object that has not been visited by a spacecraft.

Eris has one large known moon, Dysnomia.

Because Eris appeared to be larger than Pluto, NASA initially described it as the Solar System's tenth planet. This, along with the prospect of other objects of similar size being discovered in the future, motivated the International Astronomical Union (IAU) to define the term planet for the first time. Under the IAU definition approved on August 24, 2006, Eris, Pluto and Ceres are "dwarf planets", reducing the number of known planets in the Solar System to eight, the same as before Pluto's discovery in 1930.

Discovery 
Eris was discovered by the team of Mike Brown, Chad Trujillo, and David Rabinowitz on January 5, 2005, from images taken on October 21, 2003. The search team had been systematically scanning for large outer Solar System bodies for several years, and had been involved in the discovery of several other large TNOs, including 50000 Quaoar, 90482 Orcus, and 90377 Sedna.

Routine observations were taken by the team on October 21, 2003, using the 1.2 m Samuel Oschin Schmidt telescope at Palomar Observatory, California, but the image of Eris was not discovered at that point due to its very slow motion across the sky: The team's automatic image-searching software excluded all objects moving at less than 1.5 arcseconds per hour to reduce the number of false positives returned. When Sedna was discovered in 2003, it was moving at 1.75 arcsec/h, and in light of that the team reanalyzed their old data with a lower limit on the angular motion, sorting through the previously excluded images by eye. In January 2005, the re-analysis revealed Eris's slow motion against the background stars.

Follow-up observations were then carried out to make a preliminary determination of Eris's orbit, which allowed the object's distance to be estimated. The team had planned to delay announcing their discoveries of the bright objects Eris and  until further observations and calculations were complete, but announced them both on July 29 when the discovery of another large TNO they had been tracking——was controversially announced on July 27 by a different team in Spain.

Precovery images of Eris have been identified back to September 3, 1954.

More observations released in October 2005 revealed that Eris has a moon, later named Dysnomia. Observations of Dysnomia's orbit permitted scientists to determine the mass of Eris, which in June 2007 was calculated to be ,  greater than Pluto's.

Name 
Eris is named after the Greek goddess Eris (Greek ), a personification of strife and discord. The name was proposed by the Caltech team on September 6, 2006, and it was assigned on September 13, 2006, following an unusually long period in which the object was known by the provisional designation , which was granted automatically by the IAU under their naming protocols for minor planets.

The name Eris has two competing pronunciations, with a "long" or with a "short" e, analogous to the two competing pronunciations of the word era. However, Brown and his students use , with disyllabic laxing and a short e.

The Greek and Latin oblique stem of the name is Erid-, as can be seen in Italian Eride and Russian Эрида Erida, so the adjective in English is Eridian .

Xena 
Due to uncertainty over whether the object would be classified as a planet or a minor planet, because varying nomenclature procedures apply to these classes of objects, the decision on what to name the object had to wait until after the August 24, 2006, IAU ruling. For a time the object became known to the wider public as Xena. "Xena" was an informal name used internally by the discovery team, inspired by the title character of the television series Xena: Warrior Princess. The discovery team had reportedly saved the nickname "Xena" for the first body they discovered that was larger than Pluto. According to Brown,

Brown said in an interview that the naming process was stalled:

Choosing an official name 

According to science writer Govert Schilling, Brown initially wanted to call the object "Lila", after a concept in Hindu mythology that described the cosmos as the outcome of a game played by Brahman. The name could be pronounced like "Lilah", the name of Brown's newborn daughter. Brown was mindful of not making his name public before it had been officially accepted. He had done so with Sedna a year previously, and had been heavily criticized. However, no objection was raised to the Sedna name other than the breach of protocol, and no competing names were suggested for Sedna.

He listed the address of his personal web page announcing the discovery as /~mbrown/planetlila and in the chaos following the controversy over the discovery of Haumea, forgot to change it. Rather than needlessly anger more of his fellow astronomers, he simply said that the webpage had been named for his daughter and dropped "Lila" from consideration.

Brown had also speculated that Persephone, the wife of the god Pluto, would be a good name for the object. The name had been used several times for planets in science fiction and was popular with the public, having handily won a poll conducted by New Scientist magazine. ("Xena", despite only being a nickname, came fourth.) This choice was not possible once the object was classified as a dwarf (and thus minor) planet, because there was already a minor planet with that name, 399 Persephone.

The discovery team proposed Eris on September 6, 2006. On September 13, 2006, this was accepted as the official name by the IAU. Brown decided that, because the object had been considered a planet for so long, it deserved a name from Greek or Roman mythology like the other planets. The asteroids had taken the vast majority of Graeco-Roman names. Eris, whom Brown described as his favorite goddess, had fortunately escaped inclusion. "Eris caused strife and discord by causing quarrels among people," said Brown in 2006, "and that's what this one has done too."

Planetary symbols are no longer much used in astronomy, but NASA has used the Hand of Eris,  (U+2BF0), for Eris. This is a symbol from Discordianism, a religion that worships the goddess Eris. Most astrologers use this symbol, while some use a symbol resembling that of Mars but with the arrow pointing downward:  (U+2BF1). Both symbols have been included in Unicode.

Classification 

Eris is a trans-Neptunian dwarf planet (plutoid). Its orbital characteristics more specifically categorize it as a scattered-disk object (SDO), or a TNO that has been "scattered" from the Kuiper belt into more-distant and unusual orbits following gravitational interactions with Neptune as the Solar System was forming. Although its high orbital inclination is unusual among the known SDOs, theoretical models suggest that objects that were originally near the inner edge of the Kuiper belt were scattered into orbits with higher inclinations than objects from the outer belt.

Because Eris was initially thought to be larger than Pluto, it was described as the "tenth planet" by NASA and in media reports of its discovery. In response to the uncertainty over its status, and because of ongoing debate over whether Pluto should be classified as a planet, the IAU delegated a group of astronomers to develop a sufficiently precise definition of the term planet to decide the issue. This was announced as the IAU's Definition of a Planet in the Solar System, adopted on August 24, 2006. At this time, both Eris and Pluto were classified as dwarf planets, a category distinct from the new definition of planet. Brown has since stated his approval of this classification. The IAU subsequently added Eris to its Minor Planet Catalogue, designating it (136199) Eris.

Orbit 

Eris has an orbital period of 559 years. Its maximum possible distance from the Sun (aphelion) is 97.5 AU, and its closest (perihelion) is 38 AU. As the time of perihelion is defined at the epoch chosen using an unperturbed two-body solution, the further the epoch is from the date of perihelion, the less accurate the result. Numerical integration is required to predict the time of perihelion accurately. Numerical integration by JPL Horizons shows that Eris came to perihelion around 1699, to aphelion around 1977, and will return to perihelion around December 2257. Unlike the eight planets, whose orbits all lie roughly in the same plane as the Earth's, Eris's orbit is highly inclined: it is tilted at an angle of about 44 degrees to the ecliptic. When discovered, Eris and its moon were the most distant known objects in the Solar System, apart from long-period comets and space probes.

Eris's orbit is highly eccentric, and brings Eris to within 37.9 AU of the Sun, a typical perihelion for scattered objects.  This is within the orbit of Pluto, but still safe from direct interaction with Neptune (~37 AU). Pluto, on the other hand, like other plutinos, follows a less inclined and less eccentric orbit and, protected by orbital resonance, can cross Neptune's orbit. In about 800 years, Eris will be closer to the Sun than Pluto for some time (see the graph at the left).

As of 2007, Eris has an apparent magnitude of 18.7, making it bright enough to be detectable to some amateur telescopes. A  telescope with a CCD can detect Eris under favorable conditions. The reason it had not been noticed until now is its steep orbital inclination; searches for large outer Solar System objects tend to concentrate on the ecliptic plane, where most bodies are found.

Because of the high inclination of its orbit, Eris passes through only a few constellations of the traditional Zodiac; it is now in the constellation Cetus. It was in Sculptor from 1876 until 1929 and Phoenix from roughly 1840 until 1875. In 2036 it will enter Pisces and stay there until 2065, when it will enter Aries. It will then move into the northern sky, entering Perseus in 2128 and Camelopardalis (where it will reach its northernmost declination) in 2173.

Rotation 
Eris displays very little variation in brightness as it rotates due to its uniform surface, making measurement of its rotation period difficult. Precise long-term monitoring of Eris's brightness indicates that it is tidally locked to its moon Dysnomia, with a rotation period synchronous with the moon's orbital period of 15.78 Earth days. Dysnomia is also tidally locked to Eris, which makes the Eris–Dysnomia system the second known case of double-synchronous rotation, after Pluto and Charon. Previous measurements of Eris's rotation period obtained highly uncertain values ranging tens of hours to several days due to insufficient long-term coverage of Eris's rotation. The axial tilt of Eris has not been measured, but it can be reasonably assumed that it is the same as Dysnomia's orbital inclination, which would be about 78 degrees with respect to the ecliptic. If this were the case, most of Eris's northern hemisphere would be illuminated by sunlight, with 30% of the hemisphere experiencing constant illumination in 2018.

Size, mass and density 

In November 2010, Eris was the subject of one of the most distant stellar occultations yet from Earth. Preliminary data from this event cast doubt on previous size estimates.

It also indicates a geometric albedo of 0.96. It is speculated that the high albedo is due to the surface ices being replenished because of temperature fluctuations as Eris's eccentric orbit takes it closer and farther from the Sun.

The mass of Eris can be calculated with much greater precision. Based on the accepted value for Dysnomia's period at the time—15.774 days—Eris is 27% more massive than Pluto.

Models of internal heating via radioactive decay suggest that Eris could have an internal ocean of liquid water at the mantle–core boundary.

In July 2015, after nearly ten years of Eris being considered the ninth-largest object known to directly orbit the sun, close-up imagery from the New Horizons mission more accurately determined Pluto's volume to be slightly larger than Eris's, rather than slightly smaller as previously thought. Eris is now the tenth-largest object known to directly orbit the sun by volume, but remains the ninth-largest by mass.

Surface and atmosphere 

The discovery team followed up their initial identification of Eris with spectroscopic observations made at the 8 m Gemini North Telescope in Hawaii on January 25, 2005. Infrared light from the object revealed the presence of methane ice, indicating that the surface may be similar to that of Pluto, which at the time was the only TNO known to have surface methane, and of Neptune's moon Triton, which also has methane on its surface.

Unlike the somewhat reddish Pluto and Triton, Eris appears almost white. Pluto's reddish color is thought to be due to deposits of tholins on its surface, and where these deposits darken the surface, the lower albedo leads to higher temperatures and the evaporation of methane deposits. In contrast, Eris is far enough from the Sun that methane can condense onto its surface even where the albedo is low. The condensation of methane uniformly over the surface reduces any albedo contrasts and would cover up any deposits of red tholins.

Even though Eris can be up to three times farther from the Sun than Pluto, it approaches close enough that some of the ices on the surface might warm enough to sublime. Because methane is highly volatile, its presence shows either that Eris has always resided in the distant reaches of the Solar System, where it is cold enough for methane ice to persist, or that the celestial body has an internal source of methane to replenish gas that escapes from its atmosphere. This contrasts with observations of another discovered TNO, which reveal the presence of water ice but not methane.

Satellite 

In 2005, the adaptive optics team at the Keck telescopes in Hawaii carried out observations of the four brightest TNOs (Pluto, and Eris), using the newly commissioned laser guide star adaptive optics system. Images taken on September 10 revealed a moon in orbit around Eris. In keeping with the "Xena" nickname already in use for Eris, Brown's team nicknamed the moon "Gabrielle", after the television warrior princess's sidekick. When Eris received its official name from the IAU, the moon received the name Dysnomia, after the Greek goddess of lawlessness who was Eris's daughter. Brown says he picked it for similarity to his wife's name, Diane. The name also retains an oblique reference to Eris's old informal name Xena, portrayed on television by Lucy Lawless.

Exploration 
Eris was observed from afar by the outbound New Horizons spacecraft in May 2020, as part of its extended mission following its successful Pluto flyby in 2015. Although Eris was farther from New Horizons (112 AU) than it was from Earth (96 AU), the spacecraft's unique vantage point inside the Kuiper belt permitted observations of Eris at high phase angles that are otherwise unobtainable from Earth, enabling the determination of the light scattering properties and phase curve behavior of Eris's surface. 

In the 2010s, there were multiple studies for follow-on missions to explore the Kuiper belt, among which Eris was evaluated as a candidate. It was calculated that a flyby mission to Eris would take 24.66 years using a Jupiter gravity-assist, based on launch dates of April 3, 2032, or April 7, 2044. Eris would be 92.03 or 90.19 AU from the Sun when the spacecraft arrives.

See also 

 Clearing the neighbourhood
 Former classification of planets
 List of Solar System objects most distant from the Sun
 List of trans-Neptunian objects
 Mesoplanet

Explanatory notes

References

External links 

 Michael Brown's webpages about Eris and Dysnomia
 MPC Database entry for (136199) Eris
 3D orbit visualization fron NASA JPL
 Simulation of 's orbit
 Keck observatory page about the discovery of Dysnomia
 
 

 
20050105
Binary trans-Neptunian objects
Discoveries by Chad Trujillo
Discoveries by David L. Rabinowitz
Discoveries by Michael E. Brown
Dwarf planets
Named minor planets
136199
Pluto's planethood
Scattered disc and detached objects
Eris (mythology)